Gaspare di Mercurio (1926–2001) is the author of La settimana dell'anarchia del 1866 a Palermo.   Also, he has an honorary title of "Cav. di Vittorio Veneto" as mentioned at his burial site in Partinico.

References

External links
Photograph of Gaspare di Mercurio

Di Mercurio, Gaspare
1926 births
2001 deaths